Karahal is a small town in Sheopur district in the Indian state of Madhya Pradesh. It is about 44 km from Sheopur city and 165 km from Gwalior city.

Temples
 Satya Narayan Bhagwan Mandir 
 Chinta Haran Mandir 
 Hanuman Mandir at Kachiyana
 Laxmi Narayan Bhagwan Mandir at Garhi
 Annapurna mata mandir at panwada in karahal
 Bharat mata mandir
 Gaytri mata mandir
 Lord krishna-Radha mandir (beech ka mandir)

Schools
 New bright public school 
 Ganesha bless public school
 Mothers pride school
 Chitransh public school
 vidya vihar public school in panwada
 Saraswati shishu vidya mandir school karahal

References

Villages in Sheopur district

Population
Sahariya tribal population is highest in this tehsil.